The 2011 Superettan was the 11th season of Sweden's second-tier football league. The season began on 9 April 2011 and ended on 22 October 2011.

The top two teams qualified directly for promotion to Allsvenskan, the third played a play-off against the fourteenth from Allsvenskan to decide who qualified to play in Allsvenskan 2012.

The bottom two teams qualified directly for relegation to Division 1, the thirteenth and the fourteenth played a play-off against the numbers two from Division 1 Södra and Division 1 Norra to decide who qualified to play in Superettan 2012.

Teams
A total of sixteen teams contested the league, including eleven sides from the 2010 season, two relegated teams from 2010 Allsvenskan, two promoted teams from Division 1 and Qviding FIF who replaced Örgryte IS after they were automatically relegated to Division 1 before the start of the new season due to bankruptcy.

FC Trollhättan and Väsby United were relegated at the end of the 2010 season after finishing in the bottom two places of the table. They were replaced by Division 1 Norra champions Västerås SK and Division 1 Södra champions IFK Värnamo.

Jönköpings Södra IF and Östers IF both retained their Superettan spots after defeating their Division 1 opponents in a relegation/promotion playoff.

Stadia and locations

 1 Correct as of end of 2010 Superettan season

Personnel and kits

Note: Flags indicate national team as has been defined under FIFA eligibility rules. Players and Managers may hold more than one non-FIFA nationality.

Managerial changes

League table

Relegation play-offs

Brage won 7–3 on aggregate.

IFK Värnamo won 3–0 on aggregate.

Results

Season statistics

Top scorers

Top assists

Top goalkeepers
(Minimum of 10 games played)

Hat-tricks

 4 Player scored 4 goals

Attendance

See also 

Competitions
 2011 Allsvenskan
 2011 Svenska Cupen
 2011 Supercupen

Transfers
 List of Swedish football transfers winter 2010–2011
 List of Swedish football transfers summer 2011
 List of Swedish football transfers winter 2011–2012

References

External links

  

Superettan seasons
2
Sweden
Sweden